Zoë Conway is an Irish violinist, trained in both classical music and traditional fiddle-playing. She is married to fellow Irish traditional musician John McIntyre.

Early life 
Born in Dundalk in 1981, attended St Louis Secondary School, Dundalk, where she served as the leader of the Cross Border Orchestra of Ireland.

She received a Diploma in Music Theory from the Dublin Conservatory of Music and Drama and Performance Diploma in 2003 from the ABSRM.

Career 
She has performed with the RTE Concert Orchestra, the Irish Chamber Orchestra and as a member of Bill Whelan's "Riverdance".

Alongside traditional musicians Donal Lunny and Mairtin O'Connor, she is a member of the group ZoDoMo.

Conway has released 2 solo albums and 2 albums with her husband John with whom she also organises the Féile na Tána traditional music festival.

In 2019 she was awarded the Best Folk Instrumentalist prize at the RTÉ Radio 1 Folk Awards.

Discography 
 Zoë Conway (2002)
 The Horses Tail (2006)
 Go Mairir I Bhfad (2012)
 Zoë Conway and John McIntyre Live In Concert (2017)

References

External links

Irish Times coverage of Conway

Irish classical violinists
Irish fiddlers
Living people
People from Dundalk
1981 births